Fenny(Feni Bangladesh) Airfield is a former wartime United States Army Air Forces airfield in Bangladesh used during the Burma Campaign 1944-1945.  It is now abandoned.

History
Feni was the primary home of the Tenth Air Force 12th Bombardment Group, which flew B-25 Mitchell medium bombers from the airfield after its reassignment from Twelfth Air Force in southern Italy.  The group operated from Fenny from July 1944 until June 1945, flying combat missions over Burma supporting the British Fourteenth Army. When Allied forces at Imphal, India, were threatened by a Japanese offensive, the group delivered ammunition and other supplies.   In addition to the bombers, the 12th Combat Cargo Squadron used Fenny to air drop supplies and ammunition to the ground forces.   Fenny also was used as a communications station as well as an Air Technical Service Command maintenance depot.

References

 
  www.pacificwrecks.com - Fenny keyword search

External links

Airfields of the United States Army Air Forces in British India
Defunct airports in Bangladesh
Airports established in 1944